The 2013 Dutch Darts Masters was the eighth of eight PDC European Tour events on the 2013 PDC Pro Tour. The tournament took place at the Koningshof Hotel in Veldhoven, Netherlands, between 25–27 October 2013. It featured a field of 64 players and £100,000 in prize money, with £20,000 going to the winner.

Kim Huybrechts won his first European Tour title by defeating Brendan Dolan 6–3 in the final.

Prize money

Qualification
The top 32 players from the PDC ProTour Order of Merit on 30 September 2013 automatically qualified for the event. The remaining 32 places went to players from three qualifying events - 20 from the UK Qualifier (held in Dublin on 4 October), eight from the European Qualifier and four from the Host Nation Qualifier (both held at the venue in Veldhoven on 24 October).

Robert Thornton withdrew from the event the day before it started due to personal reasons and was replaced by an additional European Qualifier.

1–32

UK Qualifier
  John Bowles  (first round)
  Dan Russell (first round)
  Mickey Mansell (third round)
  Peter Hudson (first round)
  Michael Barnard (third round)
  Daryl Gurney (second round)
  Paul Barham (first round)
  Dave Ladley (first round)
  Andrew Gilding (first round)
  Mark Cox (third round)
  Mark Dudbridge (first round)
  Ross Smith (second round)
  Darren Johnson (first round)
  Joe Cullen (second round)
  Mark Lawrence (first round)
  Campbell Jackson (second round)
  James Richardson (first round)
  Steve Hine (first round)
  David Pallett (third round)
  Dean Winstanley (first round)

European Qualifier
  Jyhan Artut (first round)
  Davyd Venken (first round)
  Maik Langendorf (first round)
  Ronny Huybrechts (second round)
  Jarkko Komula (quarter-finals)
  Michael Hurtz (first round)
  Max Hopp (first round)
  Andree Welge (first round)
  Tonči Restović (first round)

Host Nation Qualifier
  Davy Verkooijen (first round)
  Vincent van der Voort (first round)
  Jerry Hendriks (first round)
  Gino Vos (second round)

Draw

References

2013 PDC European Tour
2013 in Dutch sport